Souna is an African surname. Notable people with the surname include:

Djibril Moussa Souna (born 1992), Nigerien football defender
Issaka Souna (born 1954), Nigerien politician 

Surnames of African origin